Adolf Henri "Dolf" van Kol (2 August 1902 – 20 January 1989) was a Dutch footballer who earned 33 caps for the Dutch national side between 1925 and 1931, scoring four goals. He also participated at the 1928 Summer Olympics. He played club football for Ajax, managed the club from 1942 to 1945.

References

External links
 Player profile at KNVB
 Player profile at VoetbalStats.nl

1902 births
1989 deaths
Dutch footballers
Netherlands international footballers
Dutch football managers
Olympic footballers of the Netherlands
Footballers at the 1928 Summer Olympics
AFC Ajax players
Footballers from Amsterdam
Association football defenders